Fregattenleutnant was an officer rank in the Austro-Hungarian Navy. It was equivalent to Oberleutnant of the Austro-Hungarian Army, as well to Oberleutnant zur See of the Imperial German Navy. Pertaining to the modern day's NATO rank code it could be comparable to OF-1a (senior).

The right to be assigned to Fregattenleutnant was limited to professional officers. It was superior to Korvettenleutnant (a reserve rank) and inferior to Linienschiffsleutnant. Until 1908 the rank was called Linienschiffsfähnrich (ship-of-the-line ensign).

Professional officers skipped that rank Fregattenleutnant and were regularly promoted from Seefähnrich to Fregattenleutnant (also OF-1a), the next higher rank (comparable to Oberleutnant zur See).

The rank name was selected in line to the division of war ships to specific ship categories early of the 19th century, e.g. corvette, frigate, and to ship of the line. In the Austro-Hungarian Navy the appropriate rank designations were derived as follows.
Korvettenkapitän OF-3 (equivalent: to Heer Major)
Fregattenkapitän OF-4 (equivalent: to Heer Oberstleutnant)
Linienschiffskapitän OF5; (equivalent: to deutsche Marine Kapitän zur See / Heer Oberst)

According to that systematic the rank designations to subaltern – or junior officers were derived as follows:
Korvettenleutnant OF-1b (equivalent to deutsche Marine Leutnant zur See Heer: Leutnant)
 Fregattenleutnant OF-1a (equivalent to deutsche Marine Oberleutnant zur See / Heer: Oberleutnant)
Linienschiffsleutnant OF-2 (equivalent to deutsche Marine Kapitänleutnant / Heer:Hauptmann)
This sequence of ranks can be found in the today's Croatian naval forces.

Other countries 
The rank designation Fregattenleutnent was used continuously in naval forces of former Yugoslavia and as junior officer (OF-1a) rank in modern today's naval forces of Croatia, Slovenia and Serbia.

See also
 Ranks in the Austro-Hungarian Navy
Croatian military ranks
Military ranks of Serbia
Slovenian military ranks

References 

Military ranks of Austria
Naval ranks